In mathematics, particularly in algebraic topology, the  of a topological space  presented as a simplicial complex (resp.

The  is a discrete space, and the  a topological graph. The skeletons of a space are used in obstruction theory, to construct spectral sequences by means of filtrations, and generally to make inductive arguments. They are particularly important when  has infinite dimension, in the sense that the  do not become constant as

In geometry 

For example:
 skel0(cube) = 8 vertices
 skel1(cube) = 8 vertices, 12 edges
 skel2(cube) = 8 vertices, 12 edges, 6 square faces

For simplicial sets 
The above definition of the skeleton of a simplicial complex is a particular case of the notion of skeleton of a simplicial set. Briefly speaking, a simplicial set  can be described by a collection of sets , together with face and degeneracy maps between them satisfying a number of equations.

More precisely, the restriction functor

has a left adjoint, denoted . (The notations  are comparable with the one of image functors for sheaves.) The n-skeleton of some simplicial set  is defined as

Coskeleton
Moreover,  has a right adjoint . The n-coskeleton is defined as

The 0-coskeleton is given by the Cech nerve

(The boundary and degeneracy morphisms are given by various projections and diagonal embeddings, respectively.)

The above constructions work for more general categories (instead of sets) as well, provided that the category has fiber products. The coskeleton is needed to define the concept of hypercovering in homotopical algebra and algebraic geometry.

References

External links 
 

Algebraic topology
General topology